The swimming events of the 1993 Mediterranean Games were held in Mende, Lozère in France.

Medalists

Men's events

Women's events

Medal table

References
1993 Mediterranean Games report at the International Mediterranean Games Committee website

Mediterranean Games
Sports at the 1993 Mediterranean Games
1993